Etienne-Henri Martin (7 April 1905 – 1997) was a French designer and decorator whose work combined elements of classic and avant-garde French design. He undertook many private and public decoration projects, and led the design workshops of major department stores in France and Belgium. From 1950 he was a professor at the  École nationale supérieure des arts décoratifs.

Life

Etienne Henri Martin was born in Paris on 7 April 1905.
He studied at the École Boulle, where he specialized in metal.
He worked with Edgar Brandt from 1923 to 1928.
During this period he exhibited at the Salon des Artistes Décorateurs.
He decorated the reception room for the city of Paris at the 1925 Exposition Internationale des Arts décoratifs, for which he was awarded the Grand Prize.

Martin worked for the Primavera workshop of the Printemps department store. 
He became head of an agency and a collaborator with René Prou.
He worked on many private and public commissions in France and Belgium, worked on decoration of passenger ships and worked with René Prou on the decoration of the Council Chamber of the League of Nations.
He was artistic director of the Studium Louvre, the creative workshop of the Grands Magasins du Louvre, from 1938 to 1945.
The workshop produced designs for the growing number of customers who wanted modern styles of decoration.
The designer Michel Mortier joined the Studium-Louvre in 1944.
Martin was awarded the Prix Blumenthal.

Martin became artistic and technical director for the Bon Marché department stores in Brussels, where he stayed until 1950. 
After his return from Belgium he again participated in the Salon des Artistes Décorateurs (SAD) and the Salon des Arts Ménagers. 
From 1950 he was a professor at the  École nationale supérieure des arts décoratifs.
He was also an honorary professor at the Ecole des Arts appliqués.
He was a member of the SAD Committee, and the treasurer of the SAD.
One of his pieces of furniture was acquired by the state and is held by the Musée National d'Art Moderne.
Martin died in 1997.

Style

Martin's work had elements of traditional decorative art and elements of avant-garde.
Towards the end of his career he moved towards freer forms.

Notes

Sources

1905 births
1997 deaths
French designers